Risking may refer to:

 The concept of Risk
 The 1976 film Pronto ad uccidere, also released as Risking.